The clubnose guitarfish (Glaucostegus thouin) is a critically endangered species of ray in the Glaucostegidae family. There are also old unconfirmed records from the Mediterranean and Suriname.

It has an unusual club-like tip of the snout, which separates it from other members of the genus Glaucostegus.

References

clubnose guitarfish
Fish of the Red Sea
Fish of Sri Lanka
clubnose guitarfish
Taxonomy articles created by Polbot